Bourg, also informally known as Bourg-sur-Gironde, is a commune in the Gironde department in Nouvelle-Aquitaine in southwestern France. It is part of the Côtes de Bourg wine region. Bourg originated as a fortified villa built by the Roman prefect Pontius Paulinus in the 4th century.

Population

See also
Communes of the Gironde department

References

External links

Official website

Communes of Gironde